Angels with Dirty Faces is a 1938 gangster film with James Cagney.

Angels with Dirty Faces may also refer to:

"Angels with Dirty Faces" (Sham 69 song), 1979
Angels with Dirty Faces (Tricky album), 1998
Angels with Dirty Faces (Sugababes album), 2002
"Angels with Dirty Faces" (Sugababes song), 2002
"Angels with Dirty Faces", a 1982 song by Frankie Miller, later covered by Clare Grogan
"Angels with Dirty Faces", a 1992 song by Los Lobos from Kiko
"Angels with Dirty Faces", a 2004 song by Sum 41 from Chuck
The Angels with Dirty Faces, nickname for Omar Sívori, Antonio Angelillo and Humberto Maschio, three footballers who transferred from Argentina to Italy in 1958
Angels with Dirty Faces (book by Walidah Imarisha), 2016